"Arrasando" is the third single from Thalía's 2000 Arrasando album, and it was written by herself. It is recognized as one of her signature songs. Also, it has an English version called "It's My Party". Although both share a general theme of optimism about the human race moving on from mistakes of the past, the English version is an entirely new lyric, rather than a translation. "It's My Party" later appeared on the album Thalía's Hits Remixed.

Music video
The music video was shot in Los Angeles, and it was directed by Simon Brand, who had directed also her two previous videos. Two versions of this video were filmed - Spanish and English.

Reception
The song was also well received by critics. Joey Guerra from Vibe called the "A fiery hip-swiveling rhythm which effortlessly blended independent-woman themes with Thalía's own sexy persona." The song entered the top ten in Mexico and Greece.

Challenge
In November 2019,  Thalía posted a video of her rapping the song a capella. The video went viral and started the #ArrasandoChallenge in which the people record themselves trying to rap to the song.

Single
Arrasando (Album Version) - 3:56

It's My Party / Single & LP

It's My Party (English Version) - 3:56
 It's My Party (Instrumental) - 3:56

Arrasando (Brazilian Edition)

 Arrasando (Album Version)
 Arrasando (Hitmakers Rio de Janeiro Mix)
 Arrasando (Hitmakers Rio de Janeiro Radio Edit)

Official Versions & Remixes
Arrasando (Album Version)
It's My Party (English Version)
Arrasando (Banda Version Feat. Banda Pequeños Musical)
Arrasando (Con Banda)
Arrasando (Hitmakers Rio de Janeiro Mix)
Arrasando (Hitmakers Rio de Janeiro Radio Edit)
Arrasando (M&M Blown Away Extended Mix)
Arrasando (M&M Blown Away Radio Edit)
Arrasando (M&M En La Casa Club Mix)
Arrasando (M&M En La Casa Radio Mix)
Arrasando (M&M En La Casa Dub Mix)

Chart performance

References

Thalía songs
2000 singles
Spanish-language songs
Songs written by Emilio Estefan
Song recordings produced by Emilio Estefan
Music videos directed by Simon Brand
EMI Latin singles
Songs written by Thalía
2000 songs
Songs written by Lawrence Dermer
English-language Mexican songs